This is a list of lakes of Panama, located completely or partially within the country's borders.

Lakes
 Alajuela Lake
 Arrowhead Lake
 Bayano Lake
 Ciénaga de La Macana (Club Swamp)
 Ciénaga Juncalillo (Juncalillo Swamp)
 Ciénaga Las Pitahallas (Pitaya Swamp)
 Cuenca Salud (Basin of Health)
 Gatun Lake
 Lago de Miraflores (Miraflores Lake)
 Lago El Flor (Flower Lake)
 Laguna de Changuinola (Changuinola Lagoon)
 Laguna de Jugli (Jugli Lagoon)
 Laguna de Yeguada (Herd of Horses Lagoon)
 Laguna de Matusagrati (Matusagrati Lagoon)
 Laguna de Samani (Samani Lagoon)
 Laguna Duri (Duri Lagoon)
 Laguna Rio Diablo (Devil River Lagoon)
 Las Lagunas (The Lagoons)
 Pear Lake

References

Panama
Lakes